Omega Cassiopeiae (ω Cassiopeiae) is a binary star system in the northern constellation of Cassiopeia. It has a combined apparent visual magnitude of +4.99, which means it is a faint star but visible to the naked eye. Based upon an annual parallax shift of 4.65 mas as seen from Earth, this system is located roughly 730 light years from the Sun. At that distance, the visual magnitude is diminished by an extinction of 0.16 due to interstellar dust.

This is a single-lined spectroscopic binary star system with an orbital period of 69.92 days and an eccentricity of 0.30. The visible component has the spectrum of an evolved, B-type giant star with a stellar classification of B5 III. It is a helium-weak star, a type of chemically peculiar star that displays abnormally weak absorption lines of helium for a star of its temperature.

References

B-type giants
Cassiopeiae, Omega
Cassiopeia (constellation)
Durchmusterung objects
Cassiopeiae, 46
011529
009009
0548
Helium-weak stars
Spectroscopic binaries